Hooked is a mobile application where users create and read chat fiction, short pieces of fiction told in the format of text messages between fictional characters. The app was released in September 2015 and was developed by Telepathic Inc.

Features
Hooked is a freemium smartphone app that allows users to write or read short stories made up of text messages between characters. CEO Prerna Gupta described the app as "books for the Snapchat generation" or "Twitter for fiction." As of March 2019, the app had more than 40 million active users.   

The stories are written by a mix of professional authors and crowd-sourced participants. The most popular genres are suspense and horror. The stories usually lack literary elements like character arcs, are simply written and are intended to be suspenseful or addicting. Each piece of fiction on the app is approximately 1,000 to 1,300 words long and can be read in about five minutes. Some longer stories are told in "chapters" and a 32,000-word thriller called Dark Matter was released in 2018. 

The app provides a certain number of text messages for free, then delays the next text message by 15 minutes unless the user pays for a subscription. Prior to 2020, the app offered a three-day free trial and then required users to pay. According to Gupta, the app was intended to get the younger generation to read more without getting distracted. Most users of the app are between 13 and 24 years-old.

History 
The Hooked app was first released in September 2015. Initially, Hooked featured about 200 stories that were written by professional authors selected by the app developers. The following year, Telepathic Inc. released Hooked 2.0, which allowed users of the app to create and share their own short stories. By mid-2016, the app had 700 stories written by professional authors and 9,000 stories written by users. 

Hooked had 1.8 million downloads by 2016 and 20 million download as of 2017, which generated $6.5 million in revenue. The response to Hooked prompted others to create similar text-message based short story apps, like Yarn and Tap. Starting in 2020, longer stories were introduced on the app in chapters.

Background
The idea for Hooked was conceived when Gupta was working on writing a book of her own. She and her husband tested short stories with 15,000 people and found that readers were five times more likely to read a story to its end if the story was presented in a text message format. They created Telepathic Inc., which developed Hooked. 

As of 2017, the Telepathic has raised $6 million in funding to develop and support the Hooked app.

References

Cross-platform software
Mobile applications